Passion was a short-lived disco and post-disco music band featuring convicted cult leader Dwight York. Their style mixed funk and Latin rhythms combined with sensual lyrics. An eponymous debut album was released in 1979. They continued publishing music until 1984.

Their first single "Don't Bring Back Memories" gained substantial club play when it was released in 1980. The song, written by multi-instrumentalist Ray Martinez and remixed by François Kevorkian, featured background vocals of Dara Norman, David Romero and Martha Roque. The B-side was "In New York", over eleven minutes in length.

In 1982, they released their "biggest" dance hit "Don't Stop My Love", a song written by Kashif Saleem. The band followed up with "You Can't Hide It", a song recorded under the creative control of Eric Matthew in 1984.

Dwight York afterwards released two albums titled New and Re-New  under his own label York's Records. The albums contained songs  like "Life Is But a Dream" and "I Hurt". He was later imprisoned for multiple  crimes including child sexual abuse.

Discography

Albums
1979 Don't Stop My Love  (Prelude; U.S.)
1992 Don't Stop My Love   (Unidisc; Canada)

Singles

References

American disco musicians
American soul musicians
American boogie musicians
American dance musicians
Prelude Records artists
Musical groups from New York City
Musical groups established in 1979
Musical groups disestablished in 1984